Mathias Blårud (born 6 June 1995) is a Norwegian football midfielder who currently plays for 2. divisjon side Ullensaker/Kisa.

He started his youth career in Rommen SK, and joined Vålerenga Fotball in 2010. He made his Norwegian Premier League debut in May 2013 against Tromsø.

Career statistics

Club

References

1995 births
Living people
Footballers from Oslo
Norwegian footballers
Vålerenga Fotball players
Eliteserien players
Strømmen IF players
Sogndal Fotball players
Norwegian First Division players

Association football midfielders